Sofie Goos (born 6 May 1980 in Turnhout, Belgium) is a Belgian triathlete who is a member of the Uplace Pro Triathlon Team. Goos made her big break into the sport in 2008 with wins in Ibiza, Knokke, Mechelen and Kapelle o/d Bos. In 2009, Goos won numerous races, including the Barcelona Challenge and the Florida Ironman. In Belgium, she was victorious in the 70.3 Antwerp Ironman, and in Brasschaat, Geel, Bruges, Kapelle o/d Bos and Ypres. In 2010, she won long-distance races in Lisbon and Antwerp and the Olympic Distance triathlons of Geel, Bruges Brasschaat and Knokke. In 2008 and 2009, she was nominated for Female Belgian Athlete of the Year. Goos joined the Uplace Pro Triathlon Team in 2010, allowing her to become a full-time professional triathlete. She is also a member of the Antwerp ATRIAC club.

Stabbing incident
Goos was stabbed without any reason on 15 May 2016 by an unknown man during training in Antwerp, forcing her to be treated in intensive care.

Results
 2007: 6th Ironman Switzerland
 2008:  1/4 triatlon Kapelle-op-den-Bos
 2008:  3/4 Triathlon Ibiza
 2008: 7th Ironman Lanzarote - 10:30.41
 2009:  Ironman Florida - 9:08.38
 2009:  1/1 Triathlon Barcelona
 2009:  1/2 Triathlon Antwerp
 2009:  1/4 triathlon Kapelle-op-den-Bos
 2009:  1/4 Triathlon Bruges
 2009:  1/2 Triathlon Brasschaat
 2010:  1/2 Triathlon Lisbon
 2010: 14th triathlon Abu dhabi
 2010:  1/2 Triathlon Barcelona
 2010:  1/4 Triathlon Geel
 2010: 7th 1/2 Triathlon Hawaii
 2010:  1/4 Triathlon Bruges
 2010:  1/4 Triathlon Brasschaat
 2010:  1/2 Triathlon Antwerp
 2010:  1/4 Triathlon Knokke
 2010: 4th Ironman Cozumel

References

External links

 Profile at Uplace Triathlon website 

1980 births
Living people
Sportspeople from Turnhout
Belgian female triathletes
21st-century Belgian women